Height discrimination (also known as heightism) is prejudice or discrimination against individuals based on height. In principle, it refers to the discriminatory treatment against individuals whose height is not within the normal acceptable range of height in a population. Various studies have shown it to be a cause of bullying, commonly manifested as unconscious microaggressions.

Research indicates that the human brain uses height as one factor to measure social status and fitness. Studies have observed that infants as young as 10 months old unconsciously associate height with leadership potential, power, strength and intelligence. Both the cognitive and the unconscious heuristic association between height and the mentioned traits has also been found to be stronger when assessing men than women.

Lexicology

The term heightism was coined by sociologist Saul Feldman in a paper titled "The presentation of shortness in everyday life—height and heightism in American society: Toward a sociology of stature", presented at the meeting of the American Sociological Association in 1971. Heightism was included in the Second Barnhart Dictionary of New English (1971) and popularized by Time magazine in a 1971 article on Feldman's paper.

The word is an example of Time magazine's habit of supplying new words through "unusual use of affixes", although Time itself objected to the term's inclusion in the 1991 Random Webster's College Dictionary, citing it as an example of the dictionary "straining ... to avoid giving offense, except to good usage" and "[lending] authority to scores of questionable usages, many of them tinged with politically correct views."

The term heightism can also be seen as an example of the increase in popular usage of phrases, particularly those relating to prejudice and discrimination, patterned after that of the word sexism. Height discrimination can also come in the form of pejorative slang terms such as manlet for short men, or lanklet for tall people.

Height and social discrimination

Employment wage and social experience discrimination

A 2004 study published in the Journal of Applied Psychology showed that height is strongly related to success for men. It showed that increase in height for men corresponds to increase in income after controlling for other social psychological variables like age and weight. That same year, a study published in the Journal of Political Economy conjectured a "height premium" and found that "a 1.8-percent increase in wages accompanies every additional inch of height". They also found that men's wages as adults could be linked to their height at age 16. The researchers found that on an average an increase in height by one inch at age 16 increased male adult wages by 2.6 percent. This is equal to an increase of approximately $850 in 1996 annual earnings (or $ today). In other words, the height and corresponding social experiences of a taller male adolescent at age 16 would likely translate to higher wages in later adulthood as compared to a shorter male adolescent.

Recent findings suggest that height discrimination occurs most often against racial minorities. A 2007 study published in the Journal of Vocational Behavior found that African-Americans reported higher weight and height related discrimination. This discrimination was even higher in female employees.

In 2017, attorney and author Tanya Osensky published Shortchanged: Height Discrimination and Strategies for Social Change. The book examines the cultural, medical, and occupational issues that short people face, which are often deemed unimportant and disregarded. Osensky challenges heightism by disclosing some beneficial aspects of shortness and suggesting avenues of activism and change.

In business
Some jobs require a minimum height. Other jobs require a maximum height or to be between a certain height range, such as flight attendant. These exceptions noted, in the great majority of cases a person's height would not seem to have an effect on how well they are able to perform their job. Nevertheless, studies have shown that short people are paid less than taller people, with disparities similar in magnitude to the race and gender gaps.

Surveys have uncovered that less than 3% of CEOs were below 1.70 m (5 ft 7 in) in height. 90% of CEOs are of above average height.

Perceived attractiveness
It is popularly believed that height is a revealed preference of physical attraction.

Initial studies indicated that taller men are more likely to be married and to have more children, except in societies with severe sex imbalances caused by war. However, more recent research has drawn this theory into question, finding no correlation between height and offspring count, although the sample was 200 and consisted only of delinquent youth. Moreover, research on leg length and leg-to-body ratio conflicts with the notion that there is a distinct preference for taller mates. A 2008 study found that both extremes, tall and short, reduced attractiveness, and a 2006 study found that a higher leg-to-body ratio in both genders increased aesthetic appeal.  At the roughest approximation the limb ratio findings are consistent with data relating height to human health. Conversely, research by Dan Ariely found that American women exhibit a marked preference for dating taller men, and that for shorter men to be judged attractive by women, they must earn substantially more money than taller men.

A 2012 study found that both men and women are willing to excuse height differences by using a trade-off approach. Men may compensate 1.3 BMI units with a 1 percent higher wage than their wife. Women may compensate 2 BMI units with an additional year of higher education. Furthermore, a 2015 study found that both men and women receive economic benefits from having a tall spouse.

Nonetheless, on a cultural level in post-industrial society, a sociological relationship between height and perceived attractiveness exists. For instance, in a 2019 survey performed by Ipsos in Hungary with over 500 respondents, the perfect height for men for 53% of participants was between  1.78 m (5 ft 10 in) to 1.85 m (6 ft 1 in), while regarding female ideal height, 60% of respondents stated that it should be between 1.65 m (5 ft 5 in) and 1.75 m (5 ft 9 in), indicating a predominant preference for average to moderately tall height in both sexes. This cultural characteristic of conferring relevance to height as an indicator of attractiveness, while applicable to the modernized world, is not a transcendental human quality. A study produced by the Universities of Groningen and Valencia, found that the taller a man was, the less anxious he felt about attractive, physically dominant, and socially powerful rivals.

In the media

The program attracted considerable criticism and complaints which accused the writers of reinforcing prejudice and of using offensive terms; the writers responded that their intention had been to show all prejudice was stupid and that height was chosen randomly.

S&M Short and Male, a documentary aired in 2008, demonstrated the obstacles and bigotry that short statured men face every day in life, love and work.

Law
Currently, there is one state in the United States of America, Michigan, that prohibits height discrimination. There is pending legislation introduced by Massachusetts Representative Byron Rushing which would add Massachusetts to the list. Two municipalities currently prohibit height discrimination: Santa Cruz, California, and San Francisco, California. The District of Columbia prohibits discrimination based on personal appearance. Ontario, Canada, prohibits height discrimination under the human rights code. Victoria, Australia, prohibits discrimination based on physical features under the Equal Opportunity Act of 1995.

Height requirements for employment which are not a bona fide occupational requirement are becoming less common. In 2022 the Supreme Court of Spain ruled that height requirements for joining the National Police Corps must take into account the average height for each sex in the Spanish population, disallowing a previous height rule for women.

Height and suicide in men

A research report published in the American Journal of Psychiatry found a strong inverse association between height and suicide in Swedish men. In other words, the suicide rate was higher for shorter men. This may signify the importance of childhood exposure in the etiology of adult mental disorder or reflect stigmatization or discrimination encountered by short men in their adult lives. A record linkage study of the birth, conscription, mortality, family, and census register data of 1,299,177 Swedish men followed from age 18 to a maximum of age 49 was performed and it was found that a 5-cm (2-inch) increase in height was associated with a 9% decrease in suicide risk.

See also
 Napoleon complex

References

Discrimination by type
Discrimination